Saint-Maur may refer to several communes in France:

Saint-Maur, Cher, in the Cher département
Saint-Maur, Gers, in the Gers département
Saint-Maur, Indre, in the Indre département
Saint-Maur, Jura, in the Jura département
Saint-Maur, Oise, in the Oise département
Saint-Maur-des-Bois, in the Manche département
Saint-Maur-des-Fossés, in the Val-de-Marne département
Saint-Maur-sur-le-Loir, in the Eure-et-Loir département

See also
St. Maur (disambiguation)